There's No Place Like Home is a 2018 Italian comedy-drama film directed by Gabriele Muccino.

Cast
 Stefano Accorsi as Paolo
 Carolina Crescentini as Ginevra
  as Isabella
 Tea Falco as Arianna
 Pierfrancesco Favino as Carlo
 Claudia Gerini as Beatrice
 Massimo Ghini as Sandro
 Sabrina Impacciatore as Sara
  as the priest
 Ivano Marescotti as Pietro
 Giulia Michelini as Luana
 Sandra Milo as Maria
 Giampaolo Morelli as Diego
 Stefania Sandrelli as Alba
 Valeria Solarino as Elettra
 Gianmarco Tognazzi as Riccardo

References

External links 

2018 films
2018 comedy-drama films
Italian comedy-drama films
2010s Italian-language films
Films about families
Films set on islands
Films directed by Gabriele Muccino
2010s Italian films